London Buses route 57 is a Transport for London contracted bus route in London, England. Running between Kingston and Clapham Park, it is operated by London General.

History

When tendered, route 57 was awarded to London General with the contract to commence on 2 July 2016. In February 2023, the service frequency was reduced to every 12 minutes.

Current route
Route 57 operates via these primary locations:
Kingston - Fairfield Bus Station 
Norbiton 
Kingston Hospital
Raynes Park 
Wimbledon   
South Wimbledon 
Merton Abbey
Colliers Wood 
Tooting Broadway 
Streatham
Streatham Hill 
Clapham Park

Incidents
On Friday, 28 November 2014, a woman in her sixties was struck by a number 57 bus in Streatham and pronounced dead at the scene. The driver was arrested on suspicion of careless driving.

References

External links

57 bus route Timetable

Bus routes in London
Transport in the Royal Borough of Kingston upon Thames
Transport in the London Borough of Lambeth
Transport in the London Borough of Merton
Transport in the London Borough of Wandsworth